The Country Kid is a 1923 American silent comedy drama film directed by William Beaudine for Warner Bros. It stars Wesley Barry, Spec O'Donnell, and Bruce Guerin as three orphaned brothers who struggle to preserve their inheritance and remain together.

Plot
Orphaned Ben Applegate (Barry) strives to care for his younger brothers (O'Donnell and Guerin) and run the farm left to them. Their unscrupulous legal guardian, Uncle Grimes (George Nichols) schemes to take their property and separate the brothers, but he is ultimately thwarted by a benevolent judge (George C. Pearce). The Applegates are reunited, their property restored, and they are adopted by caring neighbors.

Cast
Wesley Barry as Ben Applegate
Spec O'Donnell as Joe Applegate
Bruce Guerin as Andy Applegate
Kate Toncray as Mrs. Grimes
Helen Jerome Eddy as Hazel Warren
George Nichols as Mr. Grimes
Edmund Burns as Arthur Grant
George C. Pearce as The County Judge

Production
The story was conceived and written as a vehicle for popular child star Wesley Barry. Barry had been signed to a Warner contract by Harry Rapf in 1922 and was one of the studio's top draws at the time. William Beaudine had directed Barry with considerable success in Heroes of the Street (1922), which led to the pair working together on a number of Warner films, one of which was The Country Kid.

Release
Released at the beginning of November 1923, The Country Kid was distributed on a state rights basis, as were all Warner pictures of the early 1920s.

It garnered mixed to unfavorable reviews. A number of critics found the film "trite" and melodramatic, and many commented on Barry's increasing age. The Variety reviewer reflected, "While there is no particular finesse in the way the picture is put together, the scenes in which the three kids figure hold a definite appeal for the countless thousands with a soft spot for homely sentiment."

Box Office
According to Warner Bros records the film earned $263,000 domestically and $25,000 foreign.

Preservation
It is an extant film, archived in the David Bradley Film Collection at Indiana University and in the holdings of Warner Bros. A complete version and an abridged version are preserved. The Country Kid was one of the films purchased by Kodak for its Kodascope home library collection, the source of a number of abridged surviving films.

References

External links
 
 

1923 films
1923 comedy-drama films
1920s English-language films
American silent feature films
American black-and-white films
Films directed by William Beaudine
Warner Bros. films
1920s American films
Silent American comedy-drama films